Sedum lineare also known as carpet sedum, needle stonecrop or sea urchin, is a sedum originating in East Asia.

It has been proposed as an ideal plant for the "greening" of flat-roofed buildings in Shanghai, China, due to factors such as its ability to tolerate cold and drought, little need for soil and its roots' lack of penetrating ability,

References

lineare